The Betsileo woolly lemur or Betsileo avahi (Avahi betsileo) is a species of woolly lemur native to southeastern Madagascar, in the District of Fandriana.  The pelage differs significantly from other southeastern woolly lemurs in that it is primarily light reddish brown on most of the body and grey under the jaw and on the extremities.  The pelage is thicker on the head than other eastern woolly lemurs.

Avahi betsileo prefers to inhabit humid rainforests, are vertical clingers and leapers.

Distribution 
The Betsileo woolly lemur can be found in the Bemosary classified forest, Madagascar.

Conservation 
According to the IUCN, Avahi betsileo is classified as Endangered species.

The habitat of this species is now less than 1500 km^2 due to the impact of Deforestation in Madagascar.

References

Woolly lemurs
Mammals described in 2007